Jiangdu, historically known as Kiangtu is one of three districts of Yangzhou, Jiangsu province, China. Formerly a county, Jiangdu became a district in July 1994.

Toponymy 
The district's name in Chinese literally means "river capital", and refers to when Xiang Yu used the area as the capital of the Western Chu.

History 
Human agricultural production in the area has been dated back to approximately five to six thousand years ago, according to government sources. During the Spring and Autumn Period, it belonged to the State of Wu.

However, shortly after, Xiang Yu, leader of the rebellious Western Chu, established Jiangdu as his capital city.

In 153 BCE, the Western Han organized Jiangdu as its own county, under the administration of the Guangling Commandery. During the Eastern Han period, Guangling Commandery Grand Administrator  built a large canal to divert water from a lake and irrigate Jiangdu County. 

During the Three Kingdoms Period, the county belonged to the Wu Kingdom, and was later abolished.

The Western Jin re-established Jiangdu County, but during the Eastern Jin it was once again abolished, and merged into Yu County. Later on in the Eastern Jin period, Emperor Mu of Jin re-established Jiangdu County.

During the last years of the Sui Dynasty, Emperor Yang of Sui fled to Jiangdu to escape from rebellions in the north, and stayed until he was murdered in a coup.

In December 1937, as part of the Japanese Invasion of China, most of the county was occupied by Japanese forces, exiling the Nationalist government to the county's rural areas. Communist resistance to the occupation of Jiangdu County began in July 1940.

In November 1950, Gao Feng, the local communist party secretary, organized a large rally at the Fairy Temple for the purpose of denouncing local landlords. At they rally, PLA soldiers executed two men, aged about 80 and 30, respectively, with gunshots to the head for "refus[ing] to reform themselves".

In July 1994, Jiangdu County was abolished, and re-organized as a county-level city.

Jiangdu remained a county-level city under the administration of Yangzhou until November 2011, when it was converted into a district.

Geography 
Jiangdu District is located within east of Yangzhou, in Jiangsu province. To its east, it is border by Gaogang District, Hailing District, and Jiangyan District, all in the neighboring prefecture-level city of Taizhou. Jiangdu is bound by the Yangtze River to the south, Guangling District to the west, and the county-level cities of Gaoyou and Xinghua to the north.

The district is home to many rivers and lakes, and water accounts for 14.2% of the district's total area. 20.7% of the district is forested.

Climate

Administrative divisions

As of 2020, Jiangdu District administers 13 towns and 1 township-level farm. These divisions then in turn administer 65 residential communities and 263 administrative villages.











Daqiao




Tourism 

Major tourist spots include Shaobo Lake, Kaiyuan Temple, and the former residence of Communist revolutionary .

Notable people 

 , Qing dynasty poet and politician
 , Qing dynasty poet and scholar
 , Qing dynasty politician and diplomat
 , Qing dynasty politician
 , Qing dynasty and Republic of China doctor and scholar
 Jiang Shangqing, Communist revolutionary
 , Communist revolutionary
 Wang Shaotang,  performer
 Shu Xingbei, physicist and professor

References 
www.xzqh.org

External links
"Illustrated Album of Yangzhou Prefecture", from 1573 to 1620, has illustrations of Jiangdu District

County-level divisions of Jiangsu
Yangzhou
Jiangdu District